Mary's Big Secret (German: Marys großes Geheimnis) is a 1928 German silent film directed by Guido Brignone.

The film's art direction was by Robert A. Dietrich.

Cast
 André Mattoni 
 Ralph Arthur Roberts 
 Dolly Grey 
 Max Maxudian
 Max Maximilian 
 Lydia Potechina 
 Eva Speyer 
 Elza Temary 
 Kurt Vespermann

References

Bibliography
 John Holmstrom. The moving picture boy: an international encyclopaedia from 1895 to 1995. Michael Russell, 1996.

External links

1928 films
Films of the Weimar Republic
Films directed by Guido Brignone
German silent feature films
German black-and-white films